Smile Now, Die Later is the third studio album by American rapper Frost (formerly known as Kid Frost). It was released on October 24, 1995 via Ruthless/Relativity Records, making it his first full-length for the label. The twelve-track album features guest appearances from Above the Law, A.L.T., Kokane, O.G.Enius, Rick James, Rich Garcia and Diane Gordon. The album peaked at #119 on the Billboard 200, #36 on the Top R&B/Hip-Hop Albums chart and #2 on the Heatseekers Albums chart. It spawned three singles: "East Side Rendezvous", "La Familia" and "La Raza II", which were also reached Billboard charts.

Track listing

Chart history

References

External links

1995 albums
Gangsta rap albums by American artists
Frost (rapper) albums
Ruthless Records albums
Albums produced by Cold 187um